Eois leucampyx is a moth in the  family Geometridae. It is found on New Britain.

References

Moths described in 1926
Eois
Moths of New Guinea